Hedleyoconcha addita, also known as the Lord Howe Island conical pinwheel snail, is a species of pinwheel snail that is endemic to Australia's Lord Howe Island in the Tasman Sea.

Description
The trochoidal shell of adult snails is 5.6 mm in height, with a diameter of 7 mm, with a high conical spire, flat sutures and whorls rounded with a keeled edge. It is smooth and pale golden-brown. The umbilicus is narrowly open, partly concealed by the reflected lip of the roundly lunate aperture.

Habitat
The snail occurs only at the southern end of the island, on the summit of Mount Gower and nearby ledges.

References

 
addita
Gastropods of Lord Howe Island
Taxa named by Tom Iredale
Gastropods described in 1944